Lobophytum ignotum is a species of soft coral in the family Alcyoniidae.''

References 

Alcyoniidae
Animals described in 1956